Xian Heng Inn, Xian Heng Tavern or Xian Heng Hotel is a historic Chinese cuisine restaurant located in Shaoxing, Zhejiang province, People's Republic of China.

History

The original restaurant was founded in 1884, during the reign of the Guangxu Emperor of the Qing dynasty, but closed after a few years.

It was mentioned by writer Lu Xun in his work "Kong Yiji", with the restaurant situated in a fictionalised version of Shaoxing.

The modern inn opened to the public on September 18, 1981, to commemorate the 100th anniversary of Lu Xun's birthday.

The restaurant is known for maintaining the classic Shaoxing wine tradition that has been around since the dynastic times.  It should not be confused as a possible birthplace of the wine since that had been around for many dynasties before the restaurant.

See also

 Bianyifang
 Quanjude

References

Restaurants in China
1884 establishments in China
Chinese restaurants
Restaurants established in 1884
Restaurants established in 1981
Chinese companies established in 1981